Nino Alberto Arbasino (22 January 1930 – 22 March 2020) was an Italian writer, essayist, and politician.

Among the protagonists of Group 63, his literary production has ranged from novels (Fratelli d'Italia of 1963, rewritten in 1976 and 1993) to essay (for example Un Paese senza, 1980). He considered himself an expressionist writer, and he considered Super Elagabalus his most surrealist and also his most expressionist book: "Especially for the descriptions of the places, which are always dreamlike and delusional".

Biography
Arbasino was born in Voghera, southwestern Lombardy. He studied at the University of Milan where he graduated in law. Later he worked as journalist for magazines such as Il Mondo and the newspaper La Repubblica.  From 1983 to 1987, he was deputy in the Italian Parliament for the Italian Republican Party.

His work includes novels and essays. Arbasino was a member of the Gruppo 63.

He described himself as an expressionist writer and considered his novel Super Eliogabalo ("Super Elagabalus", 1969) as his most surreal and most expressionist book. He edited and rewrote his various works, which were reprinted in updated versions.

In the 1970s he was the host of the TV debate show Match. In December 1977 it hosted a famous debate between directors Mario Monicelli and (the emerging) Nanni Moretti. Moretti said that Monicelli's An Average Little Man was a reactionary film.

In 2004 he won the Premio Chiara for his career.

Arbasino died on 22 March 2020, at the age of 90, after a long illness.

Works
 Le piccole vacanze, Einaudi, 1957 (first edition)
 Le piccole vacanze, Einaudi, 1971, (second edition)
 Le piccole vacanze, Adelphi, 2007, (third edition)
 L'Anonimo lombardo, 1959, Einaudi
 Fratelli d'Italia, 1963, 1967, 1976, Einaudi
 Certi romanzi, 1964
 Super Eliogabalo, 1969, 1978, Einaudi
 Certi romanzi – La Belle Epoque per le scuole, 1977, Einaudi
 La narcisata, 1975, Einaudi
 Il principe costante, 2 ed., 1972, Einaudi
 La bella di Lodi, 1972, Einaudi
 In questo Stato, 1978, Garzanti Libri
 Un paese senza, 1980, Garzanti Libri
 Trans – Pacific Express, 1981, Garzanti Libri
 Matine, 1983, Garzanti Libri
 Il meraviglioso, anzi, 1985, Garzanti Libri
 La caduta dei tiranni, 1990, Sellerio di Giorgianni
 Un paese senza, 2 ed., 1990, Garzanti Libri
 Fratelli d'Italia, réédition de 1993, Adelphi
 Mekong, 1994, Adelphi
 Specchio delle mie brame, 1995, Adelphi
 Parigi o cara, 2 ed., 1996, Adelphi
 Lettere da Londra, 1997, Adelphi
 Passeggiando tra i draghi addormentati, 1997, Adelphi
 Paesaggi italiani con zombi, 1998, Adelphi
 Le muse a Los Angeles, 2000, Adelphi
 Rap!, 2001, Feltrinelli
 Dall'Ellade a Bisanzio, 2006, Adelphi
 La Vita bassa, 2009, Adelphi

Honour 
 : Knight Grand Cross of the Order of Merit of the Italian Republic (6 December 1995)

References

Further reading
Fusillo, Massimo Il Satyricon nel Novecento: fra neopicaresco e camp
Arbasino (1963) La gita a Chiasso, in Il Giorno, 23 gennaio 1963. Later republished in Gruppo 63 (1976)  Crìtica e teoria

External links 
Files about his parliamentary activities (in Italian): IX legislature.

1930 births
2020 deaths
People from Voghera
Italian Republican Party politicians
Deputies of Legislature IX of Italy
Gruppo 63
Politicians of Lombardy
Italian journalists
Italian male journalists
Italian male writers
Italian Expressionist writers
Italian theatre critics
Viareggio Prize winners
University of Milan alumni
La Repubblica people
Knights Grand Cross of the Order of Merit of the Italian Republic